Saadhuriyan is a 2005 Indian Tamil-language romantic action film written and directed by T. J. Kumar. It features Manoj, Kunal and Nandana. The score and soundtrack for the film was by Deva.

Cast 
Manoj
Kunal
Nandana

Production
T. J. Kumar, an erstwhile assistant of director K. Subhash, narrated the story of Saadhuriyan to director Bharathiraja, who recommended that his son Manoj was cast in the project. Manoj changed his stage name to Manoj Bharathi for the film, hoping that it would be a more auspicious name for him. Kunal was signed on to play a second lead role, appearing with Manoj again after Varushamellam Vasantham (2002), and a photo session featuring both actors was held in October 2004. Meera Vasudevan was cast as the lead actress, before being replaced by Rathi. Later Nandana, who had earlier appeared in Success (2003), was signed to play the lead female character.

The climax of the film was shot at director Bharathiraja's house in Neelankarai during March 2005.

Soundtrack
The score and soundtrack for the film was by Deva.
"Anju Vayasula" — Sabesh
"Kannamma Kannamma" — Tippu, Anuradha Sriram
"Naalai Enaka" — Jeevarekha
"Saadhuriyana" — Febi Mani
"Singamada" — Jayalakshmi, Mahesh Vinayaga Ram
"Vachan Vachan" — Srikanth Deva, Malathi Lakshman

Release and reception
The film had a theatrical release on 11 November 2005 across Tamil Nadu.

The film's lead pair, Manoj and Nandana, fell in love during the making of the film and later got married in December 2006.

References 

2005 films
2000s Tamil-language films
Indian romantic drama films
Indian romantic action films
2000s romantic action films
2005 romantic drama films